Yaailwation is in Sateng Sub-district, Yala City, Yala Province. It is a class 1 station,  from Thon Buri railway station. It opened in November 1919 as part of the Southern Line Khlong Sai-Balo section. The railway extended to Su-ngai Kolok in September 1921 to connect to the Malaysian railways.

Train services 
 Thaksin Special Express train No. 37 / 38 Bangkok - Su-ngai Kolok - Bangkok
 Diesel Rail Special Express train No. 41 / 42 Bangkok - Yala - Bangkok
 Rapid train No. 169 / 170 Bangkok - Yala - Bangkok
 Rapid train No. 171 / 172 Bangkok - Su-ngai Kolok - Bangkok
 Rapid train No. 175 / 176 Hat Yai Junction - Su-ngai Kolok - Hat Yai Junction
 Local train No. 447 / 448 Surat Thani - Su-ngai Kolok - Surat Thani
 Local train No. 451 / 452 Nakhon Si Thammarat- Su-ngai Kolok- Nakhon Si Thammarat
 Local train No. 453 / 454 Yala - Su-ngai Kolok - Yala
 Local train No. 455 / 456 Nakhon Si Thammarat- Yala -Nakhon Si Thammarat
 Local train No. 463 / 464 Phatthalung-Su-ngai Kolok-Phatthalung

References 
 
 
 
 

Railway stations in Thailand
Buildings and structures in Yala province
Railway stations opened in 1919